Alfred Verhulst (1921-1975) was a brigadier general in the United States Air Force.

Biography
Verhulst was born in Sheboygan Falls, Wisconsin, in 1921. He died on December 23, 1975.

Career
Verhulst originally enlisted in the United States Army Air Forces in 1942. He was commissioned an officer the following year. During World War II he served with the 39th Trooper Carrier Squadron. Conflicts he took part in include the Philippines Campaign (1944–45) and the Battle of Okinawa. Following the war he was assigned to the 437th Troop Carrier Group. In 1956 he was given command of the 438th Fighter-Bomber Group. Later in his career he was given command of the 434th Tactical Airlift Wing and was named Vice Commander of the Air Force Reserve.

Awards he received include the Legion of Merit, the Air Medal with oak leaf cluster, the Presidential Unit Citation, the Armed Forces Reserve Medal with hourglass device, and the Small Arms Expert Marksmanship Ribbon.

References

People from Sheboygan Falls, Wisconsin
Military personnel from Wisconsin
United States Air Force generals
Recipients of the Legion of Merit
Recipients of the Air Medal
American people of Dutch descent
United States Army Air Forces pilots of World War II
1921 births
1975 deaths